The 1971 season of the Soviet Top League saw Dynamo Kyiv clinching their title after three unsuccessful seasons. This season was also unique for successful performances of non-RSFSR clubs: Ararat Yerevan from the Armenian SSR took the second place, while bronze medals were awarded to Dinamo Tbilisi.

Final league table

Results

Top scorers
16 goals
 Eduard Malofeyev (Dinamo Minsk)

14 goals
 Eduard Markarov (Ararat)

10 goals
 Anatoliy Banishevskiy (Neftchi)
 Viktor Kolotov (Dynamo Kyiv)
 Vitaliy Shevchenko (Neftchi)

9 goals
 Valery Yaremchenko (Shakhtar)
 Aleksei Yeskov (SKA Rostov-on-Don)

8 goals
 Berador Abduraimov (Pakhtakor)
 Anzor Chikhladze (SKA Rostov-on-Don)
 Boris Kopeikin (CSKA Moscow)
 Eduard Kozinkevich (Shakhtar)
 Anatoliy Puzach (Dynamo Kyiv)
 Pavel Sadyrin (Zenit)

References

 Soviet Union - List of final tables (RSSSF)

1969
1
Soviet
Soviet